The general election for mayor of Alexandria, Virginia, was held on November 6, 2018. Justin Wilson was elected as mayor, running unopposed in the general election. He had defeated first-term incumbent Allison Silberberg in the Democratic primary.

Democratic primary
The Democratic primary was held on June 18. Vice-mayor Justin Wilson won the Democratic primary, unseating first-term incumbent Allison Silberberg in what was regarded to be an upset victory.

General election
Wilson was unopposed on the ballot, however write-in votes were cast. Combined voter turnout in Alexandria during the mayoral election and coinciding races was 70.48%, and turnout in the mayoral election alone was 58.51%.

References

2018
2018 United States mayoral elections
2018 Virginia elections